The Rasskazovo constituency (No.178) is a Russian legislative constituency in Tambov Oblast. The constituency was created in 2016, taking most of former territory of the Tambov constituency in the eastern Tambov Oblast, while also taking some southern rural districts from now eliminated Michurinsk constituency.

Members elected

2016

|-
! colspan=2 style="background-color:#E9E9E9;text-align:left;vertical-align:top;" |Candidate
! style="background-color:#E9E9E9;text-align:left;vertical-align:top;" |Party
! style="background-color:#E9E9E9;text-align:right;" |Votes
! style="background-color:#E9E9E9;text-align:right;" |%
|-
|style="background-color: " |
|align=left|Aleksandr Zhupikov
|align=left|United Russia
|
|55.57%
|-
|style="background-color:"|
|align=left|Roman Khudyakov
|align=left|Rodina
|
|18.27%
|-
|style="background-color:"|
|align=left|Artyom Aleksandrov
|align=left|Communist Party
|
|9.36%
|-
|style="background-color:"|
|align=left|Igor Telegin
|align=left|Liberal Democratic Party
|
|5.77%
|-
|style="background-color:"|
|align=left|Viktor Pashinin
|align=left|A Just Russia
|
|4.21%
|-
|style="background:"| 
|align=left|Gulnur Potankina
|align=left|Communists of Russia
|
|3.08%
|-
|style="background:#00A650"| 
|align=left|Artyom Spirin
|align=left|Civilian Power
|
|0.60%
|-
| colspan="5" style="background-color:#E9E9E9;"|
|- style="font-weight:bold"
| colspan="3" style="text-align:left;" | Total
| 
| 100%
|-
| colspan="5" style="background-color:#E9E9E9;"|
|- style="font-weight:bold"
| colspan="4" |Source:
|
|}

2021

|-
! colspan=2 style="background-color:#E9E9E9;text-align:left;vertical-align:top;" |Candidate
! style="background-color:#E9E9E9;text-align:left;vertical-align:top;" |Party
! style="background-color:#E9E9E9;text-align:right;" |Votes
! style="background-color:#E9E9E9;text-align:right;" |%
|-
|style="background-color: " |
|align=left|Aleksandr Polyakov
|align=left|United Russia
|
|54.58%
|-
|style="background-color:"|
|align=left|Artyom Aleksandrov
|align=left|Communist Party
|
|20.20%
|-
|style="background-color:"|
|align=left|Yelena Badak
|align=left|A Just Russia — For Truth
|
|8.70%
|-
|style="background-color:"|
|align=left|Denis Dubovitsky
|align=left|Liberal Democratic Party
|
|6.32%
|-
|style="background-color: " |
|align=left|Ilya Vorotnikov
|align=left|New People
|
|4.18%
|-
|style="background-color: "|
|align=left|Yury Antsiferov
|align=left|Party of Growth
|
|2.68%
|-
| colspan="5" style="background-color:#E9E9E9;"|
|- style="font-weight:bold"
| colspan="3" style="text-align:left;" | Total
| 
| 100%
|-
| colspan="5" style="background-color:#E9E9E9;"|
|- style="font-weight:bold"
| colspan="4" |Source:
|
|}

References

Russian legislative constituencies
Politics of Tambov Oblast